Kelsey Riggs is an anchor/reporter for ESPN/ACC Network. She has multiple duties from being a sideline reporter for ACC Football Games to anchoring several ACC Network programs, including All ACC, and anchoring SportsCenter.

Early life
Born in Charleston, South Carolina, her parents were Pam and Bryan Riggs. She first got the broadcasting bug by reading the news announcement during elementary School. She went to James Island Charter High School and Charleston Southern University where she graduated majoring in communications and played on the soccer team. She has two sisters.

Career
Riggs started her career at WBTW in Myrtle Beach, South Carolina and spent three years at WCNC-TV in Charlotte, North Carolina where she covered the Carolina Panthers in Super Bowl 50 before getting hired by ESPN to be a part of the first on-air talents of the ACC Network.

References

External links 

Kelsey Riggs profile at ESPN Press Room

Living people
American sports journalists
American women television journalists
ESPN people
21st-century American journalists
21st-century American women
Sports commentators
Year of birth missing (living people)